Chloronaphthalene may refer to:

 1-Chloronaphthalene
 2-Chloronaphthalene